Protease activated receptor 2 (PAR2) also known as  coagulation factor II (thrombin) receptor-like 1 (F2RL1) or G-protein coupled receptor 11 (GPR11) is a protein that in humans is encoded by the F2RL1 gene. PAR2 modulates inflammatory responses, obesity, metabolism, cancers  and acts as a sensor for proteolytic enzymes generated during infection. In humans, we can find PAR2 in the stratum granulosum layer of epidermal keratinocytes. Functional PAR2 is also expressed by several immune cells such as eosinophils, neutrophils, monocytes, macrophages, dendritic cells, mast cells and T cells.

Gene 

The F2RL1 gene contains two exons and is widely expressed in human tissues. The predicted protein sequence is 83% identical to the mouse receptor sequence.

Mechanism of activation 

PAR2 is a member of the large family of 7-transmembrane receptors that couple to guanosine-nucleotide-binding proteins. PAR2 is also a member of the protease-activated receptor family. PAR2 is activated by several different endogenous and exogenous proteases. It is activated by proteolytic cleavage of its extracellular amino terminus between arginine and serine. The new exposed N-terminus serves as tethered activation ligand, which bind a conserved region on extracellular loop 2 (ECL2) and activates the receptor. These receptors can also be activated non-protealytically, by exogenous peptide sequences that mimic the final amino acids of the tethered ligand, or by other proteases at cleavage sites that are not related to signaling and that can make them then irresponsive to further protease exposure. Trypsin is the major PAR2 cleaving protease that initiates inflammatory signaling. It was found that even thrombin in high concentrations is able to cleave PAR2. Another PAR2 cleaving protease is tryptase, the main protease of mast cells, which by PAR2 proteolytic cleavage induces calcium signaling and proliferation. PARs have been identified as substrates of kallikreins, which have been related to various inflammatory and tumorigenic processes. In case of PAR2, particularly speaking about kallikrein-4, -5, -6 a -14. PAR2 is known to transactivate TLR4 and epidermal growth factor receptor in diseases.

Function 
There are many studies dealing with elucidation of PAR2 function in different cells and tissues. In case of human airway and lung parenchyma PAR2 is responsible for increased fibroblasts proliferation and elevation of IL‐6, IL‐8, PGE2 and Ca2+ levels. In mice it participates on vasodilatation. Together with PAR1 its deregulation is also involved in processes of cancer cells migration and differentiation.

Agonists and antagonists 

Potent and selective small molecule agonists and antagonists for PAR2 have been discovered.

Functional selectivity occurs with PAR2, several proteases cleave PAR2 at distinct sites leading to biased signalling. Synthetic small ligands also modulate biased signalling leading to different functional responses.

So far, PAR2 has been co-crystallized with two different antagonist ligands, while an agonist-bound state model of PAR2 (with the endogenous ligand SLIGKV) has been determined through mutagenesis and structure-based drug design.

See also 

Protease-activated receptor
Protease-activated receptor 1
Protease-activated receptor 3

References

Further reading

External links 
 

Receptors
G protein-coupled receptors